Joseph Edmund Reid (30 June 1896–1936) was an English footballer who played in the Football League for Fulham, Manchester City, Newport County and Stockport County.

References

1896 births
1936 deaths
English footballers
Association football defenders
English Football League players
Hebburn Argyle F.C. players
Gateshead A.F.C. players
Manchester City F.C. players
Stockport County F.C. players
Carlisle United F.C. players
Boston Town F.C. (1920s) players
Newport County A.F.C. players
Fulham F.C. players
Annfield Plain F.C. players